Reykjavik Geothermal Ltd (RG) is a geothermal development company that specifically identifies and targets high quality geothermal resources in combination with underserved power markets.

RG was founded in Iceland in 2008 by experienced geothermal management and science team, in all aspects of the geoscience, engineering, financing and management of geothermal development, exploration and plant construction.

RG has been verified by accredited management standards and authenticated systems and frameworks including ISO 9001. The Company has implemented ISO 14001 and OHSAS 18001 and these environmental and occupational health and safety systems are pending BSI audit. Furthermore the company has implemented ISO 26000 standard on social responsibility and the SA 8000 standard on social accountability.

Headquartered in Iceland, RG is owned by management and U.S. investors. It has offices in New York City in USA, Addis Ababa in Ethiopia and in Port Moresby in Papua New Guinea.

See also
 Renewable energy in Iceland

Notes

References 
 The website of Reykjavik Geothermal, August 2012]
 British Standards Institution August 30, 2012 BSI FM 563523.
 The web of NOPEF- Nordic Project Fund: "Reykjavík Geothermal invests in East Africa" – in English
 The Geothermal Web: “Thinkgeoenergy”: "RusHydro and Reykjavik Geothermal sign geothermal cooperation agreement" – in English
 The Web of Bloomberg Businessweek: Company Overview of Reykjavik Geothermal – in English
 The Web of NewEnergyWorldNetwork: "Ambata Capital Partners invests in Reykjavik Geothermal" – in English
 Morgunblaðið 11. nóvember 2010: „Jarðhitaverkefni á Indlandi“ – in Icelandic
 Morgunblaðið: 23. Júní 2012: „Ekki leyst með skuldsetningu“ Interview with Dr. Carl Hahn former CEO of Volkswagen and the Vice Chairman of Reykjavik Geothermal. – in Icelandic
RG´s CEO interviewed in Frettabladid, Iceland, August 29, 2012.
 "Reykjavik Geothermal planning 300 mw power plant project in Ethiopia“ Thinkgeoenergy - The Geothermal Energy News Website, August 30, 2012.

External links
 

Energy companies of Iceland
Geothermal energy in Iceland
Renewable energy companies of Europe
Energy companies established in 2008
Renewable resource companies established in 2008
2008 establishments in Iceland